The Ayres Thrush, formerly the Snow S-2, Aero Commander Ag Commander, and Rockwell Thrush Commander, is an American agricultural aircraft produced by Ayres Corporation and more recently by Thrush Aircraft. It is one of the most successful and long-lived agricultural application aircraft types in the world, with almost 2,000 sold since the first example flew  years ago. Typical of agricultural aircraft, it is a single-seat monoplane of conventional taildragger configuration. Originally powered by a radial piston engine, most examples produced since the 1980s have been turboprop-powered.

Design and development

The Thrush, designed by Leland Snow, first flew in 1956 and before long was being produced in series as the S-2 by the company he founded, Snow Aeronautical. In 1965, the corporation and all of its assets were purchased by the Aero Commander division of Rockwell, which put it into production alongside the CallAir A-9 that it had also acquired, branding both unrelated (though similar) machines as "Ag Commanders". When Rockwell dropped the Aero Commander brand, the S-2 was renamed the "Thrush Commander".

In 1977, Rockwell sold off the production rights to the aircraft and the production facility at Albany, Georgia, which were purchased by Ayres Corporation, a firm which had been built on retro-fitting turboprop engines to Thrush Commanders. On June 30, 2003, Ayres' assets were purchased by Thrush Aircraft, the current producer of the aircraft.

The S-2 and its several variants have been purchased by agricultural spraying operators in many countries. Large numbers are operated in the United States and Australia, while other countries using the type include Costa Rica, France, Guyana, Iran, Israel, Jamaica, the Netherlands and the United Kingdom.

Ayres developed a special anti-narcotics crop-spraying version of the Turbo-Thrush for the United States Department of State. This version, known as the Narcotics Eradication Delivery System (NEDS) featured an armored cockpit and engine to protect against hostile ground fire. Nine were sold to the Department of State between 1983 and 1985. Ayres also attempted to market a militarized version as the Ayres Vigilante, intended for the Close Air Support role, but this failed to attract customers. IOMAX USA of North Carolina, which had previously modified Air Tractor AT-802 agricultural aircraft as reconnaissance/attack aircraft, has developed the Archangel attack aircraft modeled on the S-2R-660. The United Arab Emirates has ordered 24 Archangels, with delivery from June 2015.

Two Thrush 510Gs were modified to perform a counter-insurgency role by the Austrian company Airborne Technologies at the direction of Erik Prince, the former head of Blackwater, but in the absence of an export license the aircraft have not been used operationally.

Variants

Snow Aeronautical
(per Simpson, 2005, p. 39)
S-1 initial prototype with open cockpit.
S-2 pre-production version of S-1 – 3 built.
S-2A initial production version, powered by Continental engine – 73 built.
S-2B S-2 powered by  Pratt & Whitney R-985 – 19 built.
S-2C refined production version, wingspan increased  – 214 built.
S-2C-600 S-2C re-engined with Pratt & Whitney R-1340-AN1.
S-2D  take-off weight – 105 built.

Aero Commander
S-2D Ag Commander

Rockwell
Thrush Commander 600
Thrush Commander 800 powered by Wright R-1300.

Marsh
S2R-T Turbo Thrush Rockwell Thrush Commanders converted to turbine power by Marsh Aviation using Garrett AiResearch TPE331-1-101 engines.

Ayres
S-2R 1340 equivalent to Thrush Commander 600.
S-2R 1820
Bull Thrush
Pezetel Thrush powered by PZL-3.
 turboprop powered versions equipped with Pratt & Whitney Canada PT6A.

Thrush Aircraft
Thrush Model 400

Thrush Model 510GGeneral Electric H80 powered
Thrush Model 510GRHoneywell TPE 331 powered
Thrush Model 510PPratt & Whitney Canada PT6A-34 powered
Thrush Model 550Pratt & Whitney Canada PT6A-65AG powered
Thrush Model 710Pratt & Whitney Canada PT6A-65AG powered
Archangel Thrush 550G modified as two-seat armed attack aircraft. PT6A-67F engine.

Specifications (Thrush Commander 600)

See also

References

Bibliography

 Ayton, Mark. "Archangel: Crop Duster to Tank Buster". Air International, Vol. 92, No. 2, February 2017. pp. 24–33. .
 Green, William. Aircraft Handbook. London. Macdonald & Co. (Publishers) Ltd., 1964.
 Simpson, Rod. The General Aviation Handbook. Midland Publishing. 2005. .
Taylor, John W R. (editor). Jane's All The World's Aircraft 1976-77. London: Jane's Yearbooks, 1976. .
Taylor, John W R. (editor). Jane's All The World's Aircraft 1988-89. Coulsdon, Surrey, UK: Jane's Information Group, 1988. .

External links

 
 
 

Thrush
1950s United States agricultural aircraft
Thrush
Single-engined tractor aircraft
Low-wing aircraft
Aircraft first flown in 1956